Mahonia setosa is a shrub in the Berberidaceae described as a species in 1908. It is endemic to China, known from the provinces of Sichuan and Yunnan.

References

External links

setosa
Plants described in 1908
Endemic flora of China